The canton of Chorges is an administrative division in southeastern France. At the French canton reorganisation which came into effect in March 2015, the canton was expanded from 8 to 17 communes:
 
La Bâtie-Neuve
Bréziers
Chorges
Espinasses
Montgardin
Prunières
Puy-Saint-Eusèbe
Puy-Sanières
Réallon
Remollon
Rochebrune
La Rochette
Rousset
Saint-Apollinaire
Le Sauze-du-Lac
Savines-le-Lac
Théus

Demographics

See also
Cantons of the Hautes-Alpes department 
Communes of France

References

Cantons of Hautes-Alpes